Lycée Français International Molière de Madrid , formerly Lycée Français Molière de Villanueva de la Cañada is a French international school in Villanueva de la Cañada, Community of Madrid, Spain.

A part of the Mission laïque française (MLF), accredited by the Agency for French Education Abroad (AEFE), it serves petite section to terminale (final year of lycée, or senior high school/sixth form college). Besides French, Spanish and English are taught since the earliest age.

History
It was established in 1973 as Cours Molière in Pozuelo de Alarcón, initially as a primary school (Maternelle and Élémentaire levels).

In 1986 the management of the school was handed over to the MLF, joining its international network of schools, and opening the Collège level (first part of secondary, or middle school).

Space constraints justified the move to Villanueva de la Cañada in 1993, in new buildings allowing the opening of the Lycée level (second part of secondary, or high school).

See also
 
 Liceo Español Luis Buñuel, a Spanish international school near Paris, France

References

External links
  Lycée français international Molière, Villanueva de la Cañada (Madrid)
  Liceo francés internacional Molière, Villanueva de la Cañada (Madrid)
  Ambassade de France en Espagne: Réseau des établissements scolaires français en Espagne
  Embajada de Francia en España: Centros escolares de enseñanza francesa en España
  Portail EFEP (Écoles Françaises Espagne-Portugal)
  Portal EFEP (Escuelas Francesas España-Portugal)

French international schools in Spain
International schools in the Community of Madrid
1993 establishments in Spain
Educational institutions established in 1993